Aphanocalyx is a genus of flowering plants in the family Fabaceae. It belongs to the subfamily Detarioideae.

Species
Aphanocalyx includes the following species:
 Aphanocalyx hedinii
 Aphanocalyx heitzii
 Aphanocalyx microphyllus
 subsp. compactus

References

Detarioideae
Fabaceae genera
Taxa named by Daniel Oliver